Coldwater, Texas may refer to:

Coldwater, Dallam County, Texas
Coldwater, Sherman County, Texas
Coldwater, Wood County, Texas